ACA International  is a trade group located in the United States representing debt collection agencies, creditors, debt buyers, collection attorneys, and debt collection industry service providers. Founded in 1939 as the American Collectors Association, the organization changed its name to ACA International in 2001; it is based in Minneapolis, Minnesota and Washington, D.C.  ACA International members are located throughout the U.S. and more than 60 countries, representing more than 230,000 industry employees.

Industry overview
Collection agency services to their clients include billing, customer service, insurance verification, training, data clearinghouse services, and debt purchasing.

In 2010, third-party collection agencies recovered $54.8 billion on behalf of creditors, according to an economic impact survey conducted by Ernst & Young.   These agencies help employ more than 300,000 employees with a payroll of $10 billion.  In addition, third-party collection agencies contributed more than $85 million to charitable organizations and volunteered more than 650,000 hours in 2010.

As the trade association representing these businesses, ACA International lobbies for public policy favorable to its members, provides training and credentialing resources, establishes ethical standards and promotes the value of the industry to businesses, policymakers and consumers.

ACA code of conduct
ACA members agree to abide by a code of conduct. The code establishes standards of conduct for the industry. The code requires members to treat consumers with dignity and respect, and to appoint an officer with authority to handle consumer complaints. Under the code, ACA ceased the practice of investigating consumer complaints against members. Now, it instead forwards the complaint to the company with no follow-up or investigation.

References

External links 
 ACA website
 Economic Impact of the Third-Party Debt Collections Industry
 Fair Debt Collection Practices Act - United States Federal Trade Commission
 Consumer Financial Protection Bureau

Collection agencies
Trade associations based in the United States